Pedro María León-Páez y Brown (June 29, 1835 – December 22, 1903) was a Costa Rican and Colombian politician and judge.

References

Costa Rican politicians
1835 births
1903 deaths